George Leslie Cochran (February 12, 1889 – May 21, 1960) was a third baseman and shortstop in Major League Baseball who played briefly for the Boston Red Sox in the 1918 season. Cochran was a switch-hitter and threw right-handed. He was born in Rusk, Texas. 
 
Cochran reached the majors in 1918 with the Boston Red Sox after batting leadoff with the Kansas City Blues, the 1918 American Association champion team. Cochran debuted with Boston on July 29, 1918 and played all but one of his 24 major league games at third base. He played his final game on September 2, 1918.

In his one-season career, Cochran posted a .117 batting average (7-for-60) with seven runs, three RBI, and three stolen bases without home runs. 
 
Cochran died in Harbor City, California at the age of 71.

Fact
Although baseball encyclopedias only list Cochran as a right-handed thrower, the San Francisco Chronicle of September 4, 1918 also lists his height, weight (160 lbs.) and batting side (both).

External links

1918 Boston Red Sox
Retrosheet

Boston Red Sox players
Major League Baseball third basemen
Baseball players from Texas
1889 births
1960 deaths
People from Rusk, Texas
Bartlesville Boosters players
Topeka Jayhawks players
Topeka Savages players
Joplin Miners players
Kansas City Blues (baseball) players
Minor league baseball managers